Tomáš Portyk (born 6 April 1996) is a Czech Nordic combined skier. He was born in Jilemnice. He competed at the FIS Nordic World Ski Championships 2013 in Val di Fiemme, and at the 2014 Winter Olympics in Sochi. He competed in the 2018 Winter Olympics and the 2022 Winter Olympics.

References

External links

1996 births
Living people
Nordic combined skiers at the 2014 Winter Olympics
Nordic combined skiers at the 2018 Winter Olympics
Nordic combined skiers at the 2022 Winter Olympics
Czech male Nordic combined skiers
Olympic Nordic combined skiers of the Czech Republic
Nordic combined skiers at the 2012 Winter Youth Olympics
People from Jilemnice
Youth Olympic gold medalists for the Czech Republic
Sportspeople from the Liberec Region